Monash may refer to:


Places

Australia

Australian Capital Territory
 Monash, Australian Capital Territory, a suburb of Canberra

South Australia
 Monash, South Australia, a town

Victoria
 City of Monash, a municipality
 Division of Monash, an Australian Electoral Division
 Monash College, Melbourne
 Monash Freeway, a road linking Melbourne to Gippsland
 Monash Medical Centre, a hospital and research centre in Melbourne
 Monash Province, an electorate of the Victorian Legislative Council until 2006
 Monash Special Developmental School, a school
 Monash University, a public research university in Melbourne

Israel
 Kfar Monash, an agricultural settlement in central Israel

People
 John Monash (1865–1931), Australian World War I general
 Paul Monash (1917–2003), American producer and screenwriter

Other uses
 .monash, an Internet top-level domain
 Australian Army ship John Monash (AS 3051)

See also